Eritrean People's Democratic Front is an Eritrean opposition group. EPDF was founded in 2004 by the People's Democratic Front for the Liberation of Eritrea (SAGEM) and a group who left the Eritrean Revolutionary Democratic Front (ERDF). EPDF is led by Tewelde Ghebreselassie.

References

External links
EPDF website

Political parties in Eritrea
Political parties established in 2004